Stanisław Czaykowski, also known as Stanislas Czaykowski and Stanislaus Czaykowski (10 June 1899 – 10 September 1933) was a Polish Grand Prix motor racing driver.

In 1930 and 1933 Czaykowski competed in the French Grand Prix. In 1931 he won non-championship Casablanca Grand Prix, was second in the Dieppe and Comminges Grands Prix and third in Marne, Monza and Brignole Grands Prix. In 1932 he won non-championship Provence Grand Prix and was third in the Casablanca and Nîmes Grands Prix.

In 1932 and 1933 he competed in 24 Hours of Le Mans. In 1933 Czaykowski won British Empire Trophy.

He was one of three drivers to die during the 1933 Monza Grand Prix at the Autodromo Nazionale di Monza, along with Baconin Borzacchini and Giuseppe Campari.

Complete European Championship results
(key) (Races in bold indicate pole position)

External links

 Driver career
 Czaykowski and Bugatti

References

1899 births
1933 deaths
24 Hours of Le Mans drivers
Grand Prix drivers
Polish racing drivers
Sport deaths in Italy
Sportspeople from The Hague
Racing drivers who died while racing